Przylaski  is a village in the administrative district of Gmina Pacyna. It resides within Gostynin County, Masovian Voivodeship, in east-central Poland.

References

Przylaski